The Mercado dos Lavradores is a fruit, vegetable, flower and fish market in Funchal, Madeira. The building was designed by Edmundo Tavares and opened on 24 November 1940. The facade, main entrance and fish market contain traditional Azulejo (panels of tiles) depicting regional themes, executed by João Rodrigues. It is divided into a number of smaller squares and stairways that are used as sales venues.

On the night of 23 December (known locally as night of the market, Noite do Mercado in Portuguese), it is traditional for locals to meet in the market and surrounding streets singing Christmas songs, dance and drink in the nearby bars, which are open throughout the night to serve traditional drinks and especially the traditional Carne de vinha d'alhos sandwiches.

Gallery

References

Funchal
Buildings and structures in Madeira
Tourist attractions in Madeira
Fish markets
Farmers' markets in Portugal